Clouddead (styled as cLOUDDEAD) was an American experimental hip hop group, consisting of Doseone (Adam Drucker), Why? (Yoni Wolf) and Odd Nosdam (David Madson).

The group's name came from a nonsensical knock-knock joke Drucker's sister told him when she was five years old.

Style
Generally Drucker and Wolf provide the group's vocals while Madson produces the music. Occasionally Madson's vocals can be heard, while Drucker and Wolf provide music, especially for the group's second album.

Clouddead's sound is notoriously hard to define, and although it is undoubtedly grounded in "traditional" hip-hop, influences as varied as electronica, psychedelic music and indie rock can be heard. Because of this non-traditional take on hip-hop, more conservative elements of the rap community have characterized Clouddead as "smartarse surrealism," with some elements of the community rejecting the notion that the group can be classed as hip hop at all, ignoring Sole's request to "just call it hip hop."

History
Clouddead's first six 10-inch singles were compiled as a self-titled album, Clouddead, in 2001.

Printed on the sleeve of the single "Dead Dogs Two" is "this is cLOUDDEAD number 9 of ten," indicating that as of Ten (2004), Clouddead have finished making music as a group. In an interview around Tens release, Drucker hinted that tensions between Madson and Wolf, as well as each member's heavy workload, had hastened the group's demise.

DiscographyAlbums cLOUDDEAD (2001)
 Ten (2004)EPs The Peel Session (2001)Compilations Clouddead Beats: Collaged at Mom's (1998-2000) (2007)Singles'
 "Apt. A" (2000)
 "And All You Can Do Is Laugh" (2000)
 "I Promise Never to Get Paint on My Glasses Again" (2001)
 "Jimmy Breeze" (2001)
 "Cloud Dead Number Five" (2001)
 "Bike" (2001)
 "The Sound of a Handshake / This About the City" (2002)
 "Dead Dogs Two" (2004)

See also 
List of ambient music artists

References

External links
 Clouddead on Mush Records
 Clouddead on Big Dada

Anticon artists
American experimental musical groups
American hip hop groups
Lo-fi music groups
Musical groups established in 1999
Musical groups disestablished in 2004
1999 establishments in Ohio